Brooks is an unincorporated community and census-designated place (CDP) in Yolo County, California, located in the Capay Valley in the northwest of the county. Brooks' ZIP Code is 95606 and its area code 530. The Yocha Dehe Wintun Nation is headquartered in Brooks. The town is home to a large casino Cache Creek Casino Resort.  It lies at an elevation of 341 feet (104 m).

A post office was opened in Brooks in 1884.  According to the Greater Capay Valley Historical Society, Brooks residents had to rely on passenger train service from the Vaca Valley and Clearlake Railroad at the train depots at the surrounding towns of Cadenasso and Tancred (towns that no longer exist).  Brooks had no train station.

Demographics

Climate
This region experiences warm (but not hot) and dry summers, with no average monthly temperatures above 71.6 °F.  According to the Köppen Climate Classification system, Brooks has a warm-summer Mediterranean climate, abbreviated "Csb" on climate maps.

References

External links

Census-designated places in California
Census-designated places in Yolo County, California
Unincorporated communities in the Sacramento metropolitan area